Concei was a comune (municipality) in Trentino in the Italian region Trentino-Alto Adige/Südtirol.

On January 1, 2010 it merged (with Pieve di Ledro, Bezzecca, Molina di Ledro, Tiarno di Sopra and Tiarno di Sotto) in the new municipality of Ledro. 
   

Frazioni of Ledro
Former municipalities of Trentino